Christos Routsis (born 26 October 1985) is a professional Greek football player, currently playing as a midfielder for Agrotikos Asteras in the Gamma Ethniki.

Career
He started his career in 2005 for Panserraikos. In 2008, he moved in a season-long loan to Gamma Ethniki side Doxa Drama.

Routsis joined Doxa Drama permanently in 2010.

References

External links
Onsports.gr profile 

1985 births
Living people
Doxa Drama F.C. players
Panserraikos F.C. players
Super League Greece players
Greek footballers
Association football midfielders
Footballers from Drama, Greece